Fabio Bazzani (born 20 October 1976) is an Italian football coach and a former player who played as a striker. As a player, he was known in particular for his heading ability, as well his shooting accuracy and physical strength.

Club career

Early career
After two seasons with amateur side Boca San Lazzaro, Bazzani moved to Serie C2 club Sandonà. In 1997, he was in Serie B team Venezia, but played only twice in the season. He moved to Varese and then Arezzo, where he made an impression scoring 20 goals in 31 matches under the management of Serse Cosmi. In 2000, he returned to Venezia, but scored only five goals in 36 matches. In 2001, he rejoined his former coach Cosmi when he signed with Serie A side Perugia, where he scored ten goals.

Sampdoria
In 2002, he moved to Sampdoria, where he scored 16 goals in his first season with the blucerchiati in Serie B and 13 goals in his second campaign with Sampdoria, when in Serie A. During his second season with Sampdoria, he was capped three times in the Italian team. He was loaned to Lazio in exchange for Simone Inzaghi in January 2005, but failed to impress with the biancazzurri and returned to Sampdoria at the end of the season.

Later career
On 14 June 2007, he was signed by Brescia Calcio on a free transfer. He had originally signed for Livorno but the move subsequently cancelled, following protests by the amaranto supporters which did not want the player in their team.

On 26 July 2009, he signed a one-year contract with SPAL. He played his first game for the club on 3 August, a 2–1 win to Calcio Como at Coppa Italia. He also played the next two Coppa Italia matches, scored nil.
On 1 July 2010, he moved to Mezzolara, in Serie D.

International career
Bazzani made his senior international debut for Italy on 12 November 2003, under Giovanni Trapattoni, in a 3–1 friendly defeat against Poland in Warsaw; he made two more appearances for Italy, with his final appearance coming in a 2–0 friendly loss to Iceland in Reykjavík, on 18 August 2004, under Marcello Lippi.

Coaching career
He started his coaching career upon retiring from playing, staying at Mezzolara.

On 14 May 2021, he was appointed head coach of Serie D club Correggese. His contract expired at the end of the 2020–21 season and he left the club.

On 2 January 2022 he was hired by Bologna as a technical collaborator. On 23 May 2022, Bazzani announced his departure from Bologna.

Personal life
Bazzani has been married since 2005 to Italian showgirl and television personality Alessia Merz, with whom he had a son and a daughter.

References

External links
 Club career statistics
 National team stats
 Profile at Italia1910.com

1976 births
Footballers from Bologna
Living people
Italian footballers
Italy international footballers
Association football forwards
Venezia F.C. players
S.S.D. Varese Calcio players
S.S. Arezzo players
A.C. Perugia Calcio players
U.C. Sampdoria players
S.S. Lazio players
Brescia Calcio players
Delfino Pescara 1936 players
S.P.A.L. players
A.S.D. Mezzolara players
Serie A players
Serie B players
Serie C players
Italian football managers
A.S.D. Mezzolara managers
Serie D managers